Lee Beom-seok (October 20, 1900 – May 11, 1972) was a Korean independence activist and the first prime minister of South Korea from 1948 to 1950. He also headed the Korean National Youth Association (조선민족청년단, 朝鮮民族靑年團). His nickname was Cheolgi.

Biography
Lee Beom-seok was born in Gyeongseong (now Seoul) on October 20, 1900. Lee's father was an officer in the Joseon Dynasty and he was a descendant of Sejong the Great's son 'Gwangpyeong Daegun'.
Lee Beom-seok was exiled to the Republic of China after participating in independence activities as a teenager. In 1919, he started studying at the Shinheung military academy, a military school whose goal was to build a new army to fight for independence. Soon after, Lee fought in the Battle of Cheongsanni, a six-day engagement in eastern Manchuria. He later served as a general in the Korean Liberation Army for the Provisional Government of the Republic of Korea.

In 1945, Lee attempted to return to Korea but was forced to remain in exile in China. In 1946, he returned to Korea and helped found the  Korean National Youth Association with Ahn Ho-sang. He was opposed to Kim Gu's South-North negotiations and allied himself with Lee Syng-man to establish a unitary government in South Korea. He served as the new country's first prime minister from July 31, 1948 to April 20, 1950.

Later life and death
Following his term in office, Lee Beom-seok served as the Korean Ambassador to the Republic of China, and as Secretary of the Interior. He ran for the vice presidency in 1952, and again in 1956, but failed to win either election. Throughout the 1960s, he remained a staunch opposition leader to the ruling party. At the end of his career, Lee served as an adviser on the Board of National Unification and mentored Park Chung-Hee as an elder of the nation.

On May 10, 1972, he was granted a philosophy doctorate by the Taiwan Chinese Academy. The following day, May 11, he died of a myocardial infarction in the Seongmo hospital of Myeong-dong in Seoul. His state funeral was held in the Square of Namsan Mountain on May 17, and he was buried in Seoul National Cemetery.

Posthumous work 
 Udungbul
 Bangrangui Jeong-yeol (Passion of Wandering)
 Hangug-ui Bunno (Rage of Korea)
 Minjok Gwa Cheongnyeon (Nationality and the Youth)
 Hyeoljeon: Cheongsanni Jakjeon (Bloody battle: Strategy of Cheongsanni)
 Tomsk-ui Haneul Arae (Under the Tomsk's Sky)

See also 
 Fascism in Asia
 Ilminism
 Korean National Youth Association
 Korean independence movement

References

Site web 
 Lee Beom-seok Memorial museum 
 Lee Beom-seok 

1900 births
1972 deaths
People from Seoul
Korean independence activists
Prime Ministers of South Korea
South Korean anti-communists
Korean revolutionaries
South Korean military personnel
Korean generals
National Defense ministers of South Korea
Ambassadors of South Korea to Taiwan
Jeonju Yi clan